The 1961 South American Rugby Championship was the third edition of the competition of the leading national Rugby Union teams in South America.

The tournament was played in Uruguay and won by Argentina.

Standings 

{| class="wikitable"
|-
!width=165|Team
!width=40|Played
!width=40|Won
!width=40|Drawn
!width=40|Lost
!width=40|For
!width=40|Against
!width=40|Difference
!width=40|Pts
|- bgcolor=#ccffcc align=center
|align=left| 
|3||3||0||0||107||6||+101||6
|- align=center
|align=left| 
|3||2||0||1||65||21||+44||4
|- align=center
|align=left| 
|3||1||0||2||19||72||−53||2
|- align=center
|align=left| 
|3||0||0||3||13||105||−92||0
|}

Results

References

 IRB – South American Championship 1961

1961
1961 rugby union tournaments for national teams
rugby union
rugby union
rugby union
rugby union
International rugby union competitions hosted by Uruguay